The 2014 World RX of Finland was the 4th race of the inaugural season of the FIA World Rallycross Championship. It was held at the Tykkimäki amusement park in Kouvola. It was the first World Championship rallycross event ever held in Finland.

American Tanner Foust won the event, and became the first World Championship event winner from North America.

Heats

Semi-finals

Semi-final 1

Semi-final 2

Final

† Petter Solberg qualified for the final but was unable to take the grid. Joni-Pekka Rajala was allowed to fill his place.

Championship standings after the event

References

External links

|- style="text-align:center"
|width="35%"|Previous race:2014 World RX of Norway
|width="30%"|FIA World Rallycross Championship2014 season
|width="35%"|Next race:2014 World RX of Sweden
|- style="text-align:center"
|width="35%"|Previous race:None
|width="30%"|World RX of Finland
|width="35%"|Next race:2020 World RX of Finland
|- style="text-align:center"

Finland
World RX